Ozarks Electric Cooperative is a non-profit rural electric utility cooperative headquartered in Fayetteville, Arkansas, with district offices in Springdale, Arkansas, Stilwell, Oklahoma, and Westville, Oklahoma.

The Cooperative was organized in 1937 and the first  of power lines were energized in November 1938 to 245 meters.

The Cooperative serves portions of counties in the states of Arkansas, and Oklahoma, in a territory generally surrounding Fayetteville.  This includes the Arkansas counties of Benton, Crawford, Franklin, Madison, and Washington.

External links
Ozarks Electric Cooperative

Companies based in Arkansas
Electric cooperatives in Arkansas
Electric cooperatives in Oklahoma